Kurth Brewery was located in Columbus, Wisconsin and operated from 1859 to 1949. In 1914, it was producing about 100 barrels of beer a day, making it one of the largest breweries in southern Wisconsin. A fire destroyed the malting buildings in 1916; however, the hospitality bar remains today at the corner of Park Avenue and Farnham Street and is open Wednesday and Friday nights. The brewery is still owned by the Kurth family.

The Kurth Brewery is listed on the National Register of Historic Places.

References

Industrial buildings and structures on the National Register of Historic Places in Wisconsin
Buildings and structures in Columbia County, Wisconsin
Industrial buildings completed in 1902
Columbus, Wisconsin
Brewery buildings in the United States
National Register of Historic Places in Columbia County, Wisconsin